Redemption is the debut album by the American progressive metal band of the same name. It was formed around the friendships and compositions of guitarist/keyboardist Nicholas van Dyk, joined by well-known musicians of the genre from bands like Steel Prophet, Agent Steel, Symphony X, and Fates Warning.
The first four tracks are taken from Stephen King's novel Desperation.

Track listing
All songs written by Nick Van Dyk, except where noted.

Import bonus tracks

Personnel
Rick Mythiasin - vocals
Bernie Versailles - guitars
Nick Van Dyk - guitars, bass, keyboards
Jason Rullo - drums

Guest musicians
Michael Romeo - keyboards, orchestrations (1-4)
Ray Alder - vocals (2)
Mark Zonder - drums (7)

2003 albums
Redemption (band) albums
Albums with cover art by Travis Smith (artist)